Coalville Town Football Club is a football club based in Coalville, Leicestershire, England.

History
The club was established as Ravenstone Miners Athletic in 1926, and were originally based in the village of Ravenstone. They joined the Coalville & District League and were Division Two champions in 1933–34. The club were renamed Ravenstone Swifts in 1947 and then Ravenstone Miners Athletic in 1951. They won the Division One title five times, including in 1952–53. In 1958 the club were renamed Ravenstone. They joined the Premier Division of the North Leicestershire League in 1974 and were runners-up in 1976–77. The club were relegated to Division One at the end of the 1978–79 season, but returned to the Premier Division after being promoted in 1980–81. After finishing as runners-up in 1985–86 and 1986–87, they went on to win the Premier Division in 1988–89 and 1989–90, and moved up to Division One of the Leicestershire Senior League in 1991.

In 1995 the club moved to nearby Coalville after being unable to upgrade their Ravenslea ground, and were renamed Coalville Football Club. In 1996–97 they finished second in Division One and were promoted to the Premier Division. The club adopted their current name in 1998, and won the Leicestershire and Rutland Senior Cup in 1999–2000. They were Premier Division champions in 2001–02 and 2002–03, after which they were promoted to the Midland Alliance. In 2004–05 the club entered the FA Cup for the first time, and reached the first round, eventually losing 1–0 at Second Division Wycombe Wanderers. They were league runners-up in 2009–10, and the following season saw them reach the final of the FA Vase, losing 3–2 to Whitley Bay at Wembley Stadium. They also won the Midland Alliance, scoring 153 goals in the process and earning promotion to Division One South of the Northern Premier League.

In 2012–13 Coalville won the Westerby Cup, beating Loughborough Dynamo 2–1 in the final at the King Power Stadium. They were also Division One South runners-up and qualified for the promotion play-offs. However, they lost 2–1 to Chasetown in the semi-finals. The following season saw them finish as runners-up again. However, they lost the play-off semi-final against Mickleover Sports. In 2015–16 they qualified for the play-offs again. After beating Basford United 5–0 in the semi-finals, they defeated Shaw Lane 3–1 to earn promotion to the Premier Division.

The 2017–18 season saw Coalville win the Leicestershire & Rutland Challenge Cup with a 7–6 victory on penalties against Loughborough Dynamo. At the end of the season they were transferred to the Premier Central division of the Southern League as part of the restructuring of the non-League pyramid. The club retained the Leicestershire & Rutland Challenge Cup the following season, beating Loughborough University 4–1 in the final. In 2022–23 they reached the first round of the FA Cup again, losing 4–1 at Charlton Athletic.

Ground
When based in Ravenstone, the club played at Ravenslea. However, after the parish council refused the club permission to erect floodlights, they moved to the Owen Street Sports Ground in Coalville. Floodlights were installed at the new ground in 1996. The ground is currently also known as the Mander Cruickshank Solicitors Stadium for sponsorship purposes.

Current squad

The Southern Football League does not use a squad numbering system.

Management and coaching staff

Managerial history

Honours 
Midland Alliance
Champions 2010–11
Leicestershire Senior League
Champions 2001–02, 2002–03
North Leicestershire League
Premier Division champions 1988–89, 1989–90
Cobbin Trophy winners 1989–90
Junior Cup winners 1985–86
Coalville & District League
Division One champions 1952–53
Division Two champions 1933–34
Leicestershire and Rutland Senior Cup
Winners 1999–2000
Leicestershire and Rutland Challenge Cup
Winners 2017–18, 2018–19
Leicestershire & Rutland Junior Cup
Winners 1986–87
Leicestershire County Junior Cup North
Winners 1948–49, 1949–50
Westerby Cup
Winners 2012–13
Coalville & District Charity Cup
Winners 1952–53

Records
Best FA Cup performance: First round, 2004–05, 2022–23
Best FA Trophy performance: Fourth round, 2022–23
Best FA Vase performance: Finalists, 2010–11
Most appearances: Nigel Simms

See also
Coalville Town F.C. players
Coalville Town F.C. managers

References

External links

Official website

 
Football clubs in England
Football clubs in Leicestershire
Association football clubs established in 1926
1926 establishments in England
North Leicestershire Football League
Leicestershire Senior League
Midland Football Alliance
Northern Premier League clubs
Southern Football League clubs
Coalville
Mining association football teams in England